Long Marston railway station was a station at Long Marston, Warwickshire on the Great Western Railway line between  and , which became part of the Great Western Railway's new main line between Birmingham and Cheltenham.

History
The Oxford, Worcester and Wolverhampton Railway opened a single track branch line from Honeybourne to Stratford on 12 July 1859. Long Marston station was opened just south of the village. The OW&WR became part of the Great Western Railway, which in 1908 upgraded the route into a double-track main line.

In 1966 British Railways withdrew passenger services from Long Marston station. Freight services through Long Marston continued until 1976, when the track between Long Marston and Stratford was lifted.

Long Marston Depot

The track between Honeybourne and Long Marston remains open for non-passenger trains to and from Long Marston depot, which was built as a Ministry of Defence facility known as Long Marston Central Engineering Park. Since the privatisation of British Rail in the mid-1990s, rolling stock companies (ROSCOs) have used it to store out-of-lease rolling stock. The site is secure and secluded to minimise the risk of vandalism.

The Stratford on Avon and Broadway Railway Society was based at the former MoD depot, but in 2011 moved its stock elsewhere.

Long Marston Military Railway
In 2014, it was announced that a volunteer-run working military railway would be created on the site of the former Ministry of Defence depot. The Long Marston Military Railway project sought to keep alive military railway skills, such as re-railing of trains, as well as locomotive driving and track laying, following the disbanding of the British Army's last railway unit, the Royal Logistic Corps 275 Railway Squadron, in March 2014 as a result of Government defence cuts. The 79 Railway Squadron had been disbanded in 2012.

A "Military Railfest" was planned for 6–10 May 2015 and was expected to include about 20 former army locomotives. Barclay 0-4-0DM Mulberry was already at Long Marston and was joined by USATC S160 Class 2-8-0 number 3278 on 22 April 2014. The project had been using the shed vacated by the Stratford on Avon and Broadway Railway.

In March 2015, it was reported that the project had collapsed and that the majority of the site would be redeveloped for housing, with sidings retained for the storage of London Underground District line stock for Vivarail's conversion into diesel multiple units.

References

Further reading

External links

Disused railway stations in Warwickshire
Former Great Western Railway stations
Railway stations in Great Britain opened in 1859
Railway stations in Great Britain closed in 1966
Beeching closures in England